Pitcairnia bella is a plant species in the genus Pitcairnia. This species is native to Ecuador.

References

bella
Flora of Ecuador